Chicken Airport  is a state-owned public-use airport located in Chicken, a community in the Southeast Fairbanks Census Area of the U.S. state of Alaska. It is included in the FAA's National Plan of Integrated Airport Systems for 2011–2015, which categorized it as a general aviation facility.
Both Boundary and Eagle destinations are flag stops on the Tok-Chicken route.  The aircraft will not stop at these destinations unless there is scheduled cargo or passengers flying in or out of those destinations.

Facilities and aircraft
Chicken Airport covers an area of 68 acres (28 ha) at an elevation of 1,640 feet (500 m) above mean sea level. It has one runway designated 13/31 with a gravel surface measuring 2,500 by 60 feet (762 x 18 m). For the 12-month period ending December 31, 2005, the airport had 475 aircraft operations, an average of 39 per month: 74% general aviation and 26% air taxi.

Airlines and destinations

Statistics

References

External links
 Topographic map as of July 1956 from USGS The National Map

Airports in the Southeast Fairbanks Census Area, Alaska